Kebba Kebell Suso (born September 3, 1997) is a Gambian footballer.

Club career
He played with Gambian local top-league side Hawks FC until he signed with Maltese football league side Victoria Hotspurs in summer 2021.

References

1997 births
Living people
Gambian expatriate footballers
Gambian footballers
Banjul Hawks FC players
Gozo Football League First Division players
Expatriate footballers in Malta
Victoria Hotspurs F.C. players